Bir Silgi Bir Kalem (One Eraser One Pencil) is Turkey's largest online donation platform established to bring Turkish public schools in need with the donors who wish to help those schools through donations in-kind. BirSilgiBirKalem does not allow cash donations to be requested or made through its platform and does not interfere with the donation process.

History 
BirSilgiBirKalem was founded in 2012 by Onur Aydin, a Harvard Business School MBA with a passion for social entrepreneurship and non-profits aimed at education. Onur and his colleagues often donated goods to schools across Turkey with their own money and realized that many other people who want to do so do not find the time or make the effort to donate as the process itself is very difficult. Onur envisioned a two-sided platform for individuals to connect directly with classrooms in need, providing materials requested by teachers. With the help of his friends and funding from Turkish Philanthropy Funds, he had the first version of the site built in 2012 and started to spread the word.
Throughout 2012-2013, BirSilgiBirKalem was featured in several national newspapers of Turkey ( including Milliyet, Radikal and Hurriyet ) and several TV shows and news. The press coverage helped BirSilgiBirKalem get traction slowly, albeit the growth was not fast enough.
BirSilgiBirKalem continued to receive attention in social media. As the number of schools and donors grew, the organization was recognized and awarded for its original solution to a major problem by Ashoka, Sabancı Foundation and several other organizations.
In 2015, Google for Non-Profits selected BirSilgiBirKalem as one of the non-profits it will support in Turkey. As a result of this free advertising support, BirSilgiBirKalem finally took off. The donations in 2015 alone were bigger than the sum of all donation of the previous three years.
As of Jan 2017, donors have contributed over 1.5 million ( of which close 1M came in 2015 ) to help more than 100.000 students across Turkey.

Donation Process

Schools 
Verified teachers create a profile for their institution and provide visuals and brief information about their schools and requests. Every school is required to register using the verified credentials provided by the Turkish Ministry of Education and then is allowed to make donation in-kind requests.

Following the completion of a donation, once the school receives the goods donated, teacher is required to provide evidence that the donations are used for educational purposes by taking pictures of the students with the products and submitting a letter addressing the donor, written preferably by students.

Donors 
The donors may choose to purchase the goods they want to donate offline or online. BirSilgiBirKalem directs the contributors to various online shopping sites with different price and product range. Following the donation, the donors can monitor of the progress of their donation through the website. Every donor receives a letter from the relevant institution after the donation reaches the school and the students.

Collaboration 
BirSilgiBirKalem is funded by Turkish Philanthropy Funds (tpfund.org) and through the support of its website members.

BirSilgiBirKalem is supported by Google for Non-Profits and receives USD 10K adwards credits every month to fuel its growth.

Yurtici Kargo, Turkey's largest courier company, is also a supporter and provides discounted prices to BirSilgiBirKalem donors.

Other well known past and present supporters include Vitamin Egitim, Ashoka, Bilgi University, Sabancı Foundation.

Statistics 
As of Jan 2017, donors have contributed over 1.5 million ( of which close 1M came in 2015 ) to help more than 100.000 students across Turkey.

Awards 
Google for Non-Profits Grant 2016, Sabancı Foundation Change Makers Award 2014, Bilgi University Social Entrepreneurship Award 2013, Ashoka Fellowship Award 2013

References 

 
 
 
 </ref><ref>

Crowdfunding platforms
Non-profit organizations based in Turkey
Online financial services companies of Turkey
2012 establishments in Turkey